Ralph E. Molnar is a paleontologist who had been Curator of Mammals at the Queensland Museum and more recently associated with the Museum of Northern Arizona. He is also a research associate at the Texas natural Science Centre. He co-authored descriptions of the dinosaurs Muttaburrasaurus, Kakuru, Minmi and Ozraptor, as well as the mammal Steropodon.

References

Living people
Year of birth missing (living people)